Walnut Township is one of twenty-five townships in Bureau County, Illinois, USA. As of the 2020 census, its population was 1,597 and it contained 722 housing units.

Geography

Villages
 Walnut

Cemeteries
 Red Oak
 Walnut

Major highways
  Illinois Route 92

Demographics
As of the 2020 census there were 1,597 people, 622 households, and 395 families residing in the township. The racial makeup of the township was 95.80% White, 0.19% African American, 0.00% Native American, 0.13% Asian, 0.00% Pacific Islander, 0.13% from other races, and 3.76% from two or more races. Hispanic or Latino of any race were 2.32% of the population.

There were 622 households, out of which 30.10% had children under the age of 18 living with them, 46.14% were married couples living together, 8.68% had a female householder with no spouse present, and 36.50% were non-families. 33.40% of all households were made up of individuals, and 15.00% had someone living alone who was 65 years of age or older. The average household size was 2.28 and the average family size was 2.86.

The township's age distribution consisted of 21.2% under the age of 18, 7.3% from 18 to 24, 22.6% from 25 to 44, 27.4% from 45 to 64, and 21.5% who were 65 years of age or older. The median age was 43.6 years. For every 100 females, there were 99.2 males. For every 100 females age 18 and over, there were 98.6 males.

The median income for a household in the township was $47,794, and the median income for a family was $71,250. Males had a median income of $38,417 versus $21,667 for females. The per capita income for the township was $26,064. About 6.6% of families and 8.5% of the population were below the poverty line, including 7.1% of those under age 18 and 3.2% of those age 65 or over.

School districts
 Bureau Valley Community Unit School District 340

Political districts
 Illinois's 11th congressional district
 State House District 74
 State Senate District 37

References
 
 US Census Bureau 2007 TIGER/Line Shapefiles
 US National Atlas

External links
 City-Data.com
 Illinois State Archives

Townships in Bureau County, Illinois
Populated places established in 1849
Townships in Illinois
1849 establishments in Illinois